Haruka (Citrus tamurana × natsudaidai) is a Citrus cultivar grown in Japan and the Korean Peninsula.

Genetics and origin
Haruka was first discovered in Ehime Prefecture, Japan. Once thought to be a natural mutation of the hyuganatsu (Citrus tamurana), it is now inferred that it is a hybrid between the hyuganatsu and natsudaidai (Citrus natsudaidai), with the hyuganatsu being the seed parent and the natsudaidai being the pollen parent.

Description
The fruit is small to medium in size (around the size of an orange) and can be round, oblate, or pyriform in shape. The rind is moderately thick (around the thickness of an orange) and is yellow in color; it is smooth but porous and is fragrant. The flesh is bright yellow in color and is separated into 10-11 segments by thin membranes. It is moderately seedy. There is a circular protrusion on the non-stem end and there is sometimes a nipple at the stem end. The flavor is very sweet but rather mild. Like the hyuganatsu, the spongy, white pith is sweet and edible. It is most commonly eaten raw and is usually eaten with the pith intact. It ripens from late winter to spring and keeps for 1-3 weeks in a refrigerator.

Nutrition
Haruka is rich in vitamin A and C, and contains smaller amounts of vitamin B1 and beta-carotene.

Distribution
It is cultivated in southern Japan, mainly in Ehime and Hiroshima prefectures. It is sold in markets in Japan and is exported to Singapore, Taiwan, and Hong Kong.

Confectionery products
A flavor of the Japanese candy  is based on the haruka citrus fruit.

See also
Japanese citrus
List of citrus fruits

References

Citrus
Citrus hybrids
Edible fruits
Japanese fruit
Fruit trees
Fruits originating in East Asia